Peter Andreevich Tkachev was a Russian weapons engineer for TsNIITochMash. He is known to have worked on and modified various weapons such as the AO-38, AO-46, AO-62 and AO-63 assault rifles as well as developing the Balanced Automatics Recoil System (BARS) used in the AK-107.

References

External links
 

Firearm designers
Russian inventors
Soviet engineers
Heroes of Socialist Labour